Holla may refer to:

Places
 Holla, Telemark, a former municipality in Telemark county, Norway
 Holla, Trøndelag, a village in Hemne municipality in Trøndelag county, Norway

Music 
 "Holla", a song by EXID
 "Holla", a 2001 song from Genesis (Busta Rhymes album)
 "Holla", a melody by Ghostface Killah from his album The Pretty Toney Album
 "Holla", a song by Proyecto Uno 2003
 Holla!, a 2004 album by Baha Men, or the title track

Other 
 Holla, a surname of the Kota Brahmins of Karnataka state of India
 Holla, a typeface created by Rudolf Koch

See also
 Hola (disambiguation)
 Holler (disambiguation)